42nd BSFC Awards
December 12, 2021

Best Film:
Drive My Car

The 42nd Boston Society of Film Critics Awards, honoring the best in filmmaking in 2021, were given on December 12, 2021.

Winners

 Best Picture:
 Drive My Car
 Best Director:
 Ryusuke Hamaguchi – Drive My Car
 Best Actor:
 Hidetoshi Nishijima – Drive My Car
 Best Actress:
 Alana Haim – Licorice Pizza
 Best Supporting Actor:
 Troy Kotsur – CODA
 Best Supporting Actress:
 Jessie Buckley – The Lost Daughter
 Best Screenplay:
 Ryusuke Hamaguchi and Takamasa Oe – Drive My Car
 Best Animated Film:
 Flee
 Best Documentary:
 Summer of Soul (...Or, When the Revolution Could Not Be Televised)
 Best English Language Film:
 The Power of the Dog
 Best Cinematography:
 Ari Wegner – The Power of the Dog
 Best Film Editing:
 Affonso Gonçalves and Adam Kurnitz – The Velvet Underground
 Best Original Score:
 Jonny Greenwood – Spencer
 Best New Filmmaker:
 Maggie Gyllenhaal – The Lost Daughter
 Best Ensemble Cast:
 Licorice Pizza

References

External links
 Official website

2021
2021 film awards
2021 awards in the United States
2021 in Boston
December 2021 events in the United States